Aitkin station in Aitkin, Minnesota, United States, is a brick passenger depot built on the Northern Pacific Railway mainline, opening on January 26, 1916. The rail line is now part of the BNSF Railway. The depot symbolizes the importance of the railroad in Aitkin's growth and development.

The railroad line was initially built in 1871. By the early 1900s, Aitkin was emerging as the region's leading supply center, and the old wood-framed depot was considered grossly inadequate. The railway started construction of the new brick depot in 1915. It was built in the Mission Revival style with cut-stone trimmings and a German tile roof. The station was listed on the National Register of Historic Places in 1982 as the Northern Pacific Depot.

Passenger train service to Aitkin station ended on May 24, 1969, when trains 57 and 58 were discontinued between Duluth and Staples.

The building is now occupied by the Aitkin County Historical Society as the Depot Museum.  Exhibits focus on the heritage of Aitkin County, including riverboating on the upper Mississippi, Native American culture and immigrant pioneers.

References

External links
Depot Museum - Aitkin County Historical Society

History museums in Minnesota
Museums in Aitkin County, Minnesota
Aitkin, Minnesota
Railway stations on the National Register of Historic Places in Minnesota
Railway stations in the United States opened in 1916
National Register of Historic Places in Aitkin County, Minnesota
Mission Revival architecture in Minnesota
Former railway stations in Minnesota
1916 establishments in Minnesota
Aitkin, Minnesota
Transportation in Aitkin County, Minnesota
Railway stations closed in 1969